Megaera is one of the Erinyes in Greek mythology.

Megaera may also refer to:

 464 Megaira, an asteroid named after the Erinye
 HMS Megaera (1849), a Royal Navy frigate
 A taxonomic synonym for Trimeresurus, a genus of  pit vipers

See also 
 HMS Megaera
 Megara (mythology), the oldest daughter of Creon, king of Thebes, in Greek mythology
 Megara (disambiguation)